Dokshytsy is a town in Vitebsk Region, Belarus. Its population in 2010 was 6,600. The town has a significant Chassidic history

History
The town is first mentioned in a document of Grand Duke Vytautas dated 1407 which refers to tributaries called "doxyczahe." Within the Grand Duchy of Lithuania, Dokshytsy was part of Minsk Voivodeship

In 1793, Dokshitsy was acquired by the Russian Empire as a result of the Second Partition of Poland and incorporated into the Minsk Governorate; in 1795 it was briefly made a city before losing a portion of its territory and reverting to village status two years later. During the War of 1812 it was overrun and destroyed by the French.

In 1897 the population was 2,762 which by 1925 had grown to approximately 3,000 souls.

From 1921 until 1939, Dokshytsy (Dokszyce) was part of the Second Polish Republic.

On 17 September 1939, Dokshytsy was occupied by the Red Army and, on 14 November 1939, incorporated into the Byelorussian SSR.

From 9 July 1941 until 2 July 1944, Dokshytsy was occupied by Nazi Germany and administered as a part of the Generalbezirk Weißruthenien of Reichskommissariat Ostland. The Germans destroyed the city and set up a military garrison. Jews of the city were gathered in a ghetto on 30 September 1941. On 29 May 1942, 2600 Jews were executed on a site outside the city. 

In April 1942, hundreds of young people were sent from the ghetto to a labor camp in Glambukia. During this period an underground organization was established in the ghetto, headed by Joseph Shapira.

The ghetto in Dokszyce was established in November 1941. Its border ran from the bridge to Głeboker Street, to the front side of the synagogue courtyard, then down Polotsker Street to Garden’s Beer Hall and the Berezena River, then included the market place up to the side of the synagogue courtyard. It was surrounded by boards, fences, and barbed wire and guarded by the local police. The resettlement took place on November 30, 1941, on a bitterly cold and snowy day. The town’s 3,000 Jews were given only half an hour to assemble on the marketplace with all their belongings. The authorities then gave them only three hours to move into the ghetto. Much of their property, including livestock, was confiscated or stolen by the local police during the resettlement. The ghetto area was very overcrowded— between three and four families had to share a single dwelling. However, some of the houses vacated by Jews outside stood empty, due to the high proportion of Jews in the town.

On 2 July 1944, Dokshytsy was liberated by the Red Army. The town resumed its status as a part of the Byelorussian SSR. Since 1991, it has belonged to the independent Republic of Belarus.

After World War 2 the Jewish community was never re-established.

Gallery

References

External links
 

Borisovsky Uyezd
Cities in Belarus
Dokshytsy District
Holocaust locations in Belarus
Minsk Voivodeship
Populated places in Vitebsk Region
Wilno Voivodeship (1926–1939)